Kay Otto Fisker, Hon. FAIA (14 February 1893 – 21 June 1965) was a Danish architect, designer and educator. He is mostly known for his many housing projects, mainly in the Copenhagen area, and is considered a leading exponent of Danish Functionalism.

Education and career
Kay Fisker was born on 14 February 1893 in Frederiksberg, Copenhagen. He entered the Royal Danish Academy of Fine Arts in 1909 and while there worked at the offices of leading Scandinavian architects such as Anthon Rosen, Sigurd Lewerentz, Gunnar Asplund and Hack Kampmann parallel to his studies. In 1915, in collaboration with Aage Rafn, he won a competition to design the railway stations along the Almindingen-Gudhjem railway on the Danish island of Bornholm.

After graduating, his career as a practising architect was dominated by numerous influential residential projects. Vestersøhus was built from 1935 to 1939 by Fisker and C. F. Møller. It instantly became a model in Denmark for the balcony and bay window blocks of the time.

A key building in his production was Aarhus University (1931–43), considered to be one of the most important examples of Danish Functionalism, which he designed in collaboration with C. F. Møller, Povl Stegmann, and Carl Theodor Marius Sørensen. Kay Fisker also designed the Danish Academy in Rome.

Academia
From 1936 to 1963 Fisker was a professor at the Royal Academy and as teacher of the school's class on housing he was known as an inspiring lecturer with great influence on Danish housing culture. In 1953 and 1957 he was a visiting professor at the Massachusetts Institute of Technology.

Selected buildings
 Railway stations, Bornholm (1915–15)
 Hornbækhus housing, Copenhagen (1922)
 Århus University, Århus (1932–43)
 Vester Søhus housing, Copenhagen (with C. F. Møller, 1935–39)
 Dronningegården housing, Copenhagen (with Eske Kristensen, 1943–58)
 Voldparken housing, Copenhagen (with others, 1945–51)
 Danish Academy in Rome, Rome, Italy (1963–65)

Awards 
 1926: Eckersberg Medal
 1947: C. F. Hansen Medal
 1958: Prince Eugen Medal for architecture
 1964: Heinrich Tessenow Medal

Bibliography
 Ibler, Marianne:  Kay Fisker and the Danish Academy in Rome. Archipress. March 2006.

See also

 Architecture of Denmark

References

External links 
 
 Landsted tegnet af Kay Fisker
 Kay Fisker på gravsted.dk

1893 births
1965 deaths
Danish architects
20th-century American architects
Royal Danish Academy of Fine Arts alumni
Honorary Fellows of the American Institute of Architects
Recipients of the Eckersberg Medal
Recipients of the C.F. Hansen Medal
Recipients of the Prince Eugen Medal
 01